The East 7th Street Historic District in Hopkinsville, Kentucky is a  historic district which was listed on the National Register of Historic Places in 1983.  It included 17 contributing buildings, and is roughly E. 7th St. from Campbell to Belmont Streets.

It includes Virginia Park, which is separately listed on the National Register, and up to 1912 was the site of an unpretentious frame home (c.1845) of John C. Latham, a Hopkinsville businessman and philanthropist.

It includes Greek Revival, Queen Anne, and Prairie School architecture.

References

National Register of Historic Places in Christian County, Kentucky
Historic districts on the National Register of Historic Places in Kentucky
Greek Revival architecture in Kentucky
Queen Anne architecture in Kentucky
Prairie School architecture in Kentucky
Buildings and structures completed in 1850
Hopkinsville, Kentucky